Patrick Richard McCarthy (born 31 May 1983) is an Irish former professional footballer who played as a centre-back. He is currently interim head coach of Premier League club Crystal Palace.

Born in Dublin, he began his football career as a junior with Manchester City before joining Leicester City in 2005 where he spent three seasons before joining Charlton Athletic in the summer of 2007. He remained with Charlton for just twelve months, joining Crystal Palace in the summer of 2008 where he remained until 2016. McCarthy has also played for Boston United and Notts County on loan during the early part of his career and Sheffield United, Bolton Wanderers and Preston North End, also as a loan player.

Having previously been the coach of Crystal Palace's under-18s side since 2016, in 2023 McCarthy was appointed interim manager of the first team following the sacking of Patrick Vieira.

Club career
McCarthy was born in Dublin. He joined Leicester City in March 2005 for a fee of £100,000 from Manchester City, signing a three-year contract. He had never played for Manchester City's first team but had enjoyed loan spells at Boston United and Notts County during 2002 and 2003. Boston had made a bid to sign McCarthy on a permanent basis in February 2003.

McCarthy became a favourite with the Leicester fans, due to his no-nonsense style of play, and in July 2006 was named club captain for the 2006–07 season. His season was cut short when he dislocated his shoulder in a training accident in February 2007. Nonetheless, McCarthy expressed his wish to leave Leicester before the start of next season, despite being offered a new contract.

McCarthy moved to Charlton Athletic for a fee of £650,000 in June 2007, but spent only a year at The Valley, moving across south-east London to sign for Crystal Palace in the summer of 2008, with Mark Hudson travelling in the opposite direction. McCarthy was troubled by a series of shoulder injuries which restricted him from playing in much of the 2008–09 and the 2009–10 seasons, but this did not stop him being named Palace captain in the run-up to the 2010–11 season.

McCarthy missed the entire 2012–13 season with a groin injury, and made only one appearance in the subsequent Premier League season. Despite this, he signed a one-year contract extension with Palace in September 2014. Despite being given a new deal, first-team chances remained limited, and so, on 3 October 2014, McCarthy joined Sheffield United on an initial one-month loan deal and made his début the following day as United lost 3–2 away at Chesterfield. His first goal for the Blades came in the next match in a 2–2 draw against Leyton Orient at Bramall Lane. At the end of the loan period McCarthy returned to Palace and was named amongst the substitutes for an away fixture against Manchester United on 8 November. However, on 11 November, it was confirmed that McCarthy's loan with the Blades had been renewed until 28 December 2014. In his first game back at United, McCarthy was sent off in a Yorkshire derby away at Doncaster Rovers with ten men United eventually going on to win 1–0.

McCarthy signed for Bolton Wanderers on loan in March 2015, a prankster had telephoned the West Bromwich Albion manager Tony Pulis pretending to be Bolton manager Neil Lennon weeks previously, with an enquiry for Gareth McAuley as the main point of interest. Pulis himself recommended his old Palace captain McCarthy, whom Bolton duly signed in an unconnected incident later in the season. McCarthy made five appearances in a Bolton shirt, but had to return to Palace after picking up an injury in Wanderers 2–2 draw with Brentford at Griffin Park.

McCarthy signed for newly promoted Preston North End on 3 October on a 93-day loan, and went straight into the squad to make his debut against Sheffield Wednesday on the same day. However, he was substituted after ten minutes due to injury.

On 13 June 2016, it was announced that McCarthy would be released by Crystal Palace on expiry of his contract on 30 June.

International career
McCarthy represented the Republic of Ireland Under-16 team at the 2000 UEFA European Under-16 Championship and the Under-19 team at the 2002 UEFA European Under-19 Championship.
He appeared for the Under-21 and B side too. 
In September 2009 McCarthy received a call up by then manager Giovanni Trapattoni for a friendly against South Africa played in Limerick, where he was an unused substitute.

Coaching career
On 2 December 2016, six months after his retirement from playing, McCarthy was appointed under-18s coach at Crystal Palace, replacing Ken Gillard, who left the club in November to join Arsenal.

On 17 March 2023, after the sacking of manager Patrick Vieira, the club announced that McCarthy would take over as first-team manager on an interim basis.

Career statistics

As a player

As a manager

Honours
Crystal Palace
Football League Championship play-offs: 2013
Crystal Palace Goal of the Season: 2009

References

External links
Paddy McCarthy player profile at cpfc.co.uk
Paddy McCarthy player profile at cafc.co.uk
Paddy McCarthy player profile at lcfc.com

1983 births
Living people
Association footballers from Dublin (city)
Republic of Ireland association footballers
Republic of Ireland youth international footballers
Republic of Ireland under-21 international footballers
Republic of Ireland B international footballers
Association football defenders
Manchester City F.C. players
Boston United F.C. players
Notts County F.C. players
Leicester City F.C. players
Charlton Athletic F.C. players
Crystal Palace F.C. players
Sheffield United F.C. players
Bolton Wanderers F.C. players
English Football League players
Cherry Orchard F.C. players
Premier League players